Strizhi is the name of several inhabited localities in Russia.

Urban localities
Strizhi, Orichevsky District, Kirov Oblast, an urban-type settlement in Orichevsky District of Kirov Oblast

Rural localities
Strizhi, Kirovo-Chepetsky District, Kirov Oblast, a village in Pasegovsky Rural Okrug of Kirovo-Chepetsky District of Kirov Oblast
Strizhi, Vereshchaginsky District, Perm Krai, a village in Vereshchaginsky District, Perm Krai
Strizhi, Yusvinsky District, Perm Krai, a village in Yusvinsky District, Perm Krai
Strizhi, Rostov Oblast, a settlement in Zelenolugskoye Rural Settlement of Martynovsky District of Rostov Oblast